The Ballybowler North Ogham Stone is an ogham stone and a National Monument located in County Kerry, Ireland.

Location

Ballybowler North ogham stone is located near to the Conor Pass.

History

This stone was erected as a grave marker, with inscription in Primitive Irish, some time in the early medieval period. On the Record of Monuments and Places it bears the code KE043-108. And also makes meaning to the viewers.

References

National Monuments in County Kerry
Ogham inscriptions